Dean Travers (born 17 June 1996) is a Caymanian alpine ski racer.

He competed at the 2015 World Championships in Beaver Creek, USA, in the Super-G.

Dow Travers is his older brother and Anthony Travers is his father.

References

External links
 

1996 births
Caymanian male alpine skiers
Living people